The women's 100 metre breaststroke SB11 event at the 2016 Paralympic Games took place on 13 September 2016, at the Olympic Aquatics Stadium. No heats were held.

Final 
18:52 13 September 2016:

Notes

Swimming at the 2016 Summer Paralympics